Kalkadoon may refer to:
 
 Kalkadoon, Queensland, a suburb of Mount Isa, north-west Queensland, Australia
 Kalkatungu people, also known as the Kalkadoon people, an indigenous Australian tribe of the Mount Isa region
 Kalkatungu language, also known as the Kalkadoon language, now extinct
 Kalkadoon Wars, a series of late 19th century hostile encounters between the Kalkadoon people and European settlers
 Kalkadoon grasswren (Amytornis ballarae), a species of small bird endemic to north-west Queensland
 

Language and nationality disambiguation pages